Defending champion Rafael Nadal defeated David Ferrer in the final, 7–5, 6–2 to win the men's singles tennis title at the 2010 Italian Open. It was his record-extending fifth Italian Open title.

Seeds
The top eight seeds receive a bye into the second round.

Draw

Finals

Top half

Section 1

Section 2

Bottom half

Section 3

Section 4

Qualifying

Seeds

Qualifiers

Lucky losers

Qualifying draw

First qualifier

Second qualifier

Third qualifier

Fourth qualifier

Fifth qualifier

Sixth qualifier

Seventh qualifier

References

External links
Main Draw
Qualifying Singles

Italian Open - Singles
Men's Singles